Balmshell is a cosmetic line developed by Canadian identical twin sisters Jennifer and Fiona Lees.

Description
Balmshell products were launched in Holt Renfrew stores in Canada in 2006. The brand now includes lip gloss and the Smear Campaign products. The line is sold at Shoppers Drug Mart, and usually associated with "BROS". Murale, and London Drugs stores across Canada.

References

Cosmetics companies of Canada
Cosmetics brands
Canadian brands